Redl-Zipf is a railway station near the village of Zipf, Upper Austria, Austria. The train services are operated by ÖBB.

Train services
The station is served by the following services:

External links
Austrian Railway (ÖBB) website 

Railway stations in Upper Austria